Paul Vincent Donovan (September 1, 1924 – April 27, 2011) was an American prelate of the Roman Catholic Church.  He served as the first bishop of the new Diocese of Kalamazoo in Michigan from 1971 to 1994.

Biography

Early life 
Paul Donovan was born on September 1, 1924, in Bernard, Iowa.  His family later move to Lansing, Michigan, where he entered St. Mary's Cathedral High School.. Having decided to become a priest, Donovan began his priestly studies in 1941 at St. Joseph Seminary. In 1946, he went to St. Gregory Seminary in Cincinnati, Ohio, receiving a Bachelor of Philosophy degree there.  After finishing at St. Gregory's, Donovan entered Mount St. Mary Seminary in Norwood, Ohio to study theology.

Priesthood 
Donovan was ordained a priest by Bishop Joseph Henry Albers for the Diocese of Lansing on May 20, 1950. After his ordination, Donovan was assigned as associate pastor of St. Mary Star of the Sea Parish in Jackson, Michigan.  He left St. Mary in 1951 to serve as assistant to Bishop Albers for the next five years.  Donovan was sent to Rome to study at the Pontifical Lateran University. earning a Licentiate of Canon Law in 1957. 

After returning to Michigan, Donovan was appointed pastor of Our Lady of Fatima Parish near Jackson,  serving there from 1959 to 1968.  He was transferred to Flint, Michigan, in 1968 to become pastor of St. Agnes Parish.

Bishop of Kalamazoo 
On June 15, 1971, Pope Paul VI named Donovan the first bishop of the newly created Diocese of Kalamazoo. He was consecrated on July 21, 1971, by Cardinal John Dearden. The co-consecrators were Bishops Alexander M. Zaleski and Michael Green. Donovan choose as his episcopal motto: "To Serve Rather Than Be Served."

Retirement and legacy 
On November 22, 1994, Pope John Paul II accepted Donovan's resignation as bishop of Kalamazoo for health reasons.

Paul Donovan died at age 86 on April 27, 2011, in Wayland Township, Michigan. He had driven into a small pound in a secluded area, and suffered a fatal heart attack after reaching the shore.  He was buried at Mount Olivet Cemetery in Kalamazoo.

References

People from Dubuque County, Iowa
People from Kalamazoo, Michigan
20th-century Roman Catholic bishops in the United States
1924 births
2011 deaths
Roman Catholic bishops of Kalamazoo
Roman Catholic Diocese of Lansing
Catholics from Iowa